Anxietas inspirata is a species of extremely small deep water sea snail, a marine gastropod mollusk in the family Seguenziidae.

References

 Marshall B.A. (1991). Mollusca Gastropoda : Seguenziidae from New Caledonia and the Loyalty Islands. In A. Crosnier & P. Bouchet (Eds) Résultats des campagnes Musorstom, vol. 7. Mémoires du Muséum National d'Histoire Naturelle, A, 150:41-109

External links
 To Encyclopedia of Life
 To World Register of Marine Species

inspirata
Gastropods described in 1991